Ma Chengqing (born 15 November 1975) is a Chinese basketball player. She competed in the women's tournament at the 1996 Summer Olympics.

References

1975 births
Living people
Chinese women's basketball players
Olympic basketball players of China
Basketball players at the 1996 Summer Olympics
People from Nanning
Chinese expatriate basketball people
Chinese expatriate sportspeople in South Korea
Expatriate basketball people in South Korea
Asian Games medalists in basketball
Asian Games silver medalists for China
Basketball players at the 1998 Asian Games
Medalists at the 1998 Asian Games